Swan Township may refer to:

 Swan Township, Warren County, Illinois
 Swan Township, Noble County, Indiana
 Swan Township, Taney County, Missouri
 Swan Township, Holt County, Nebraska 
 Swan Township, Vinton County, Ohio

See also
 Swan (disambiguation)

Township name disambiguation pages